The 1977 Louisiana Tech Bulldogs football team was an American football team that represented Louisiana Tech University as a member of the Southland Conference during the 1977 NCAA Division I football season. In their eleventh year under head coach Maxie Lambright, the team compiled a 9–1–2 record and as both Southland Conference and Independence Bowl champions.

Schedule

References

Louisiana Tech
Southland Conference football champion seasons
Independence Bowl champion seasons
Louisiana Tech Bulldogs football seasons
Louisiana Tech Bulldogs football